Alexandre François Marie, Viscount of Beauharnais (28 May 1760 – 23 July 1794) was a French political figure and general during the French Revolution. He was the first husband of Joséphine Tascher de la Pagerie, who later married Napoleon Bonaparte and became empress of the First French Empire. Beauharnais was executed by guillotine during the Reign of Terror.

Family
Beauharnais was born in Fort-Royal (today's Fort-de-France), Martinique. He was the son of Governor François de Beauharnais, Marquess de la La Ferté-Beauharnais, and Marie Anne Henriette Françoise Pyvart de Chastullé. On 13 December 1779 in Paris, he married Joséphine Tascher de la Pagerie, the future Empress of France. They had two children, Eugène (1781–1824) and Hortense (1783–1837).

Career
Beauharnais fought in Louis XVI's army in the American Revolutionary War. He was later deputy of the noblesse in the Estates-General, and was president of the National Constituent Assembly from 19 June to 3 July 1791 and from 31 July to 14 August 1791. Made a general in 1792 (during the French Revolutionary Wars), he refused, in June 1793, to become Minister of War. He was named General-in-Chief of the Army of the Rhine in 1793.

Death
On 2 March 1794, the Committee of General Security ordered his arrest. Accused of having poorly defended Mainz during the siege in 1793, and considered an aristocratic suspect, he was jailed in the Carmes prison and sentenced to death during the Reign of Terror. His wife, Josephine, was jailed in the same prison on 21 April 1794, but she was freed after three months, thanks to the trial of Maximilien Robespierre. Beauharnais was guillotined, together with his cousin Augustin, on the Place de la Révolution (today's Place de la Concorde) in Paris, only five days before the deposition and execution of Robespierre.

References

External links

 

1760 births
1794 deaths
People from Fort-de-France
Viscounts of Beauharnais
Alexandre
Members of the National Constituent Assembly (France)
French generals
Military leaders of the French Revolutionary Wars
French people executed by guillotine during the French Revolution
French people of the American Revolution
Martiniquais politicians
Burials at Picpus Cemetery